The Washita River is a river in the states of Texas and Oklahoma in the United States.

Geography
The Washita River forms in eastern Roberts County, Texas, near the town of Miami in the Texas Panhandle. The river crosses Hemphill County, Texas and enters Oklahoma in Roger Mills County. It cuts through the Oklahoma counties of Roger Mills, Custer, Washita, Caddo, Grady, Garvin, Murray, Carter, and Johnston before emptying into Lake Texoma, which is the modern border between Bryan County and Marshall County.

The river bisects the heart of the Anadarko Basin, the fifth-largest natural gas formation area in the United States.

The Washita's river bed is made up of unstable mud and sand, and its banks are composed of steeply incised and erosive red earth. This makes it one of the most silt-laden streams in North America.

Tributaries
Along its path, the Foss Dam impounds the Washita River in Custer County to create the Foss Reservoir. Several reservoirs in the Washita River valley hold the waters of small tributaries, including Fort Cobb Lake, Lake Chickasha, and Arbuckle Reservoir.

History
French explorers encountered the Washita River in the early 18th century while traveling upstream on the Red River and thought it was the same stream described by friendly Choctaw tribesmen as the Ouachita River. They soon found that it appeared very different from descriptions of the Ouachita, and named it the Faux Ouachita (False Ouachita). The name was later referred to by English-speaking American settlers as False Washita. After the American Civil War, Americans referred to the river as the Washita.

In 1842, General and future President Zachary Taylor established Fort Washita near the lower end of the river to protect resettled citizens of the Choctaw and Chickasaw nations, who had been removed from the Southeastern United States, from the Plains Indians inhabiting the area.

During the later Indian Wars, the Battle of Washita River (also known as the Washita River Massacre) occurred at dawn on November 27, 1868. Lt. Col. George Armstrong Custer’s 7th U.S. Cavalry attacked Black Kettle’s Cheyenne village on the Washita River near present-day Cheyenne, Oklahoma, killing many inhabitants.

Capt. Wyllys Lyman's wagon train was besieged by Indians near the Washita in Hemphill County on September 9–14, 1874.

See also
List of Oklahoma rivers
List of Texas rivers

References

External links

Washita River Paddling Information
Oklahoma Digital Maps: Digital Collections of Oklahoma and Indian Territory

Rivers of Oklahoma
Rivers of Texas
Rivers of Bryan County, Oklahoma
Rivers of Marshall County, Oklahoma
Rivers of Johnston County, Oklahoma
Rivers of Carter County, Oklahoma
Rivers of Murray County, Oklahoma
Rivers of Garvin County, Oklahoma
Tributaries of the Red River of the South